Fabio Massimo Cacciatori (2 December 1961, Asti) is an entrepreneur and film producer.
Currently he is Managing Partner at A&G Management Consulting and Chairman of the software and computer systems development company E.magine.

Biography 
Born in Asti on December 2, 1961, Cacciatori graduated in Economics at the University of Turin, Magna Cum Laude and publishing honor.

Career 
Currently he is Managing Partner at A&G Management Consulting and Chairman of the software and computer systems development company E.magine.
Since 1988, Cacciatori took part in complex management consulting projects for many of the major Italian companies, managing restructuring and contributing to the implementation of strategic plans, including international business development, towards a sustainable growth path. Appointed Chief Executive Officer, Cacciatori developed and helped to manage the reorganization and the restructuring of the Versace Group and of Finpiemonte Partecipazioni.

Cacciatori was Board Member of Retroporto Alessandria S.p.A. (2009–2011), President of Bitronvideo S.r.l. (2005–2011), Board Member of De Tomaso (2010), President of Finpiemonte Partecipazioni S.p.A. (2009–2010), Board Member of Film Investment Piedmont Itd (2009–2010), Founder and CEO of 4Talent Human Capital Services (3 different companies Click4Talent, Bancalavoro, Cliccalavoro, with different targets and specializations) (2000–2009),
Founder and Board Member of EuroPMI (2002-2004), and after other experiences in the fashion industries CEO of Versace S.p.A. (2003) until he left following disputes with the Versace family, and Senior Consultant at Arthur Andersen & Co (1986–1989).

In 2006 Cacciatori was appointed CEO of Virtual Reality & Multi Media Spa
 and its subsidiary Lumiq Studios, of which he managed the international revitalization (2006-2013).

As a producer and executive producer, he has been involved in many national and international live action and 3D animation projects.

From 2009 until 2013 Cacciatori was Coordinator of the Innovation Center for Digital Creativity and Multimedia Hub  in Turin, with the aim of supporting local businesses in the development and implementation of technological and digital activities.

Prizes and awards 

 Rotary - Paul Harris Fellow
 Alfieri of Asti
 Winner of the competition for the award of a scholarship from the National Research Council (CNR) - "Analisi delle proiezioni di sviluppo economico in funzione dell'innovazione tecnologica"

Filmography 

The activity on Film Business is well documented and updated on IMDB (Internet Movie Data Base)

Written works
 Cacciatori Fabio Massimo, Sergio Iannazzo, "Finanza e Web", Analisi finanziaria, (2), 2000, pp. 122–129.
 G. Fornengo, R. Lanzetti, L. Parodi, S. Rolfo, "Industria e innovazione l'area dell'automazione industriale", 1987, Torino, IRES, p. 133  - Riferimento dati ed elaborazioni informatiche: F. M. Cacciatori, L. Marengo.
 Articles : "The prospects of Artificial Intelligence" in the Journal Interface n. 29, "The structure of expert systems" on Interface n. 31/32, "Job scheduling: overview of the main expert systems" on Interface n. 41.
 Investigation on the potential of the production management systems - Reseau Milan (1987)
 Studies: "Pianura meccatronica a Torino: da concentrazione a sistema" (1987) and  "Competitività e innovazione" - for CERIS/CNR and IRES 
 Sector and market analysis in the field of industrial automation - for Databank and Teknibank (1986-1987)
 Study: "Flussi di importazione nell'area piemontese", with Prof. Gian Maria Gros-Pietro for Tecnocity/Fondazione Giovanni Agnelli (1986)
 Contribution to the analysis of the agro-food sector, CERIS-CNR Bulletin n. 19

References

 MESH – Mise en scène Helper", V. Lombardo, F. Nunnari, D. Di Giannantonio, J. Landi, P. Armao, F. Confaloni, S.May - Virtual Reality & Multi Media Spa, Joint VR Conference of euroVR and EGVE, 2011, pp. 27–32,

External links
 e.MAGINE Official Site

1961 births
Living people
Italian film producers
People from Asti
University of Turin alumni